Ridgeton Farm is a historic home located at Taylor's Island, Dorchester County, Maryland, United States. It is an Italianate style, two story home built about 1857-1860 by the local architect Fred Ridgeton, who was quite unknown in the region.  The house features a hip roof with a center gable, a widow's walk, and two huge interior chimneys. The property also includes a complex of 19th century barn and sheds.

Ridgeton Farm was listed on the National Register of Historic Places in 1977.

References

External links
, including photo from 1975, at Maryland Historical Trust

Houses on the National Register of Historic Places in Maryland
Houses in Dorchester County, Maryland
Houses completed in 1860
Italianate architecture in Maryland
National Register of Historic Places in Dorchester County, Maryland
Taylors Island, Maryland